The First Presbyterian Church in Danville, Kentucky is a historic church on West Main Street in Danville, in Boyle County.  It was built in 1832.  It was added to the National Register of Historic Places in 1986.

McDowell Park, which includes a former cemetery of the church, is part of the historic site.

References

See also
National Register of Historic Places listings in Kentucky

Presbyterian churches in Kentucky
Churches on the National Register of Historic Places in Kentucky
Gothic Revival church buildings in Kentucky
Churches completed in 1832
19th-century Presbyterian church buildings in the United States
Churches in Boyle County, Kentucky
National Register of Historic Places in Danville, Kentucky
1832 establishments in Kentucky